Medaeops is a genus of crabs in the family Xanthidae, containing the following species:

Medaeops edwardsi Guinot, 1967
Medaeops gemini Davie, 1997
Medaeops granulosus (Haswell, 1882)
Medaeops merodontos Davie, 1997
Medaeops neglectus (Balss, 1922)
Medaeops potens Mendoza, Chong & Ng, 2009
Medaeops serenei Ng & McLay, 2007

References

Xanthoidea